The Prime Minister of Jordan, Hani Al-Mulki, was tasked with forming a cabinet on 29 May 2016. The new cabinet was sworn in by King Abdullah II on 1 June 2016. After the September 2016 general election, Mulki formed a new cabinet. The Cabinet consisted of 28 members, three of them also serving as Deputy Prime Ministers. 11 Ministers returned from the latest formation of the previous cabinet of Abdullah Ensour, while 9 others had served in earlier cabinets. 8 Ministers had no previous experience in cabinet. Four women obtained a position as Minister. Three university presidents were appointed to Mulki's cabinet: Rida Khawaldeh, Wajih Owais and Mahmoud Sheyyab. The cabinet reformed the Ministry of Youth, which had been abandoned in 2012.

Policies
The cabinet was formed to prepare the country for the upcoming general elections. Shortly after being sworn in the cabinet announced to form task forces headed by the Deputy Prime Ministers to address issues put forward in the Letter of Designation by King Abdullah II. On 5 June 2016, Al-Mulki announced to present action plans for all 19 points mentioned in the Letter of Designation, broadly falling in the categories of political, economic and administrative issues.

Several days after taking office Mulki announced that members of the cabinet would personally visit service institutions, with the goal of improving services.

Mohamed Al-Dameeh, a commentor of the newspaper Asharq Al-Awsat, expected the Al-Mulki cabinet to prioritize economic affairs.

First Cabinet
The cabinet that was sworn in consisted of:

 Prime Minister and Minister of Defense: Hani Al-Mulki
 Deputy Prime Minister for Services and Minister of Education: Mohammad Thneibat
 Deputy Prime Minister and Minister of Foreign Affairs and Expatriates: Nasser Judeh
 Deputy Prime Minister for Economic Affairs and Minister of Industry, Trade and Supply: Jawad Anani
 Minister of Agriculture: Rida Khawaldeh
 Minister of Awqaf and Islamic Affairs: Wael Arabiyat
 Minister of Culture: Adel Tweisi
 Minister of Energy and Mineral Resources: Ibrahim Saif
 Minister of Environment: Yaseen Khayyat
 Minister of Finance: Omar Malhas
 Minister of Health: Mahmoud Sheyyab
 Minister of Higher Education and Scientific Research: Wajih Owais
 Minister of Information and Communications Technology: Majd Shweikeh
 Minister of Interior: Salameh Hammad
 Minister of Justice: Bassam Talhouni
 Minister of Labour: Ali Ghezawi
 Minister of Municipal Affairs: Walid Masri
 Minister of Planning and International Cooperation: Imad Fakhoury
 Minister of Political and Parliamentary Affairs and Minister of State: Musa Maaytah
 Minister of Public Sector Development: Yasera Ghosheh
 Minister of Public Works and Housing: Sami Halaseh
 Minister of Social Development: Khawla Armouti
 Minister of State: Khaled Hneifat
 Minister of State for Media Affairs: Mohammad Momani
 Minister of State for Prime Ministry Affairs: Fawaz Irshaidat
 Minister of Tourism and Antiquities: Lina Annab
 Minister of Transport: Yahya Kisbi
 Minister of Water and Irrigation: Hazem Nasser
 Minister of Youth: Rami Wreikat

Second cabinet
King Abdullah II of Jordan tasked the prime minister Hani Al-Mulki to reform the cabinet after the 2016 Jordanian general election on 20 September 2016. The new cabinet consisted of 29 ministers, among which were two women. The new cabinet was sworn in by King Abdullah II on 28 September 2016. the three deputies kept their positions: Nasser Judeh: Deputy Prime Minister in addition to Minister of Foreign Affairs and Expatriates, Mohammad Thneibat: Deputy Prime Minister for Services and Minister of Education, and Jawad Anani: Deputy Prime Minister for Economic Affairs but he was assigned as a Minister of Investments instead of the Industry, Trade and Supply. On 15 January 2017 the cabinet saw a reshuffle, in which seven ministers left and five ministers joined.

 Hani Al-Mulki: Prime Minister and Minister of Defense
 Jawad Anani: Deputy Prime Minister for Economic Affairs and Minister of Investments
 Mohammad Thneibat: Deputy Prime Minister for Services and Minister of Education
 Nasser Judeh: Deputy Prime Minister and Minister of Foreign Affairs and Expatriates
 Salameh Hammad: Minister of Interior.
 Hazem Nasser: Minister of Water and Irrigation:
 Adel Tweisi: Minister of Culture
 Musa Maaytah: Minister of Political and Parliamentary Affairs and Minister of State
 Imad Fakhoury: Minister of Planning and International Cooperation
 Ali Ghezawi: Minister of Labor.
 Mahmoud Sheyyab: Minister of Health
 Wajih Owais: Minister of Higher Education and Scientific Research
 Yahya Kisbi: Minister of Transport
 Yaseen Khayyat: Minister of Environment
 Walid Masri: Minister of Municipal Affairs
 Ibrahim Saif: Minister of Energy and Mineral Resources
 Mohammad Momani: Minister of State for Media Affairs
 Sami Halaseh: Minister of Public Works and Housing
 Awad Al-Bakheet: Minister of Justice
 Majd Shweikeh: Minister of Information and Communications Technology
 Omar Malhas: Minister of Finance
 Rida Khawaldeh: Minister of Agriculture
 Rami Wreikat: Minister of Youth
 Fawaz Irshaidat: Minister of State for Prime Ministry Affairs
 Wael Arabiyat: Minister of Awqaf and Islamic Affairs
 Yasera Ghosheh: Minister of Public Sector Development
 Lina Annab: Minister of Tourism and Antiquities
 Khawla Armouti: Minister of Social Development:
 Khaled Hneifat: Minister of State

References

2016 establishments in Jordan
2016 disestablishments in Jordan
Cabinet of Jordan
Prime Ministry of Jordan
Cabinets established in 2016
Cabinets disestablished in 2016